Kristoffer Tønnessen (born 1 October 1997) is a Norwegian football defender who plays for Start.

He made his league debut for Jerv in the 2013 3. divisjon, and took part in successive promotions to the 2016 1. divisjon. At the end of the season, Jerv was only minutes away from yet another promotion, but ultimately lost the decisive playoff match. The next year, Tønnessen made his debut for Norway U21. In the summer of 2019 he went to Start, for whom he made his first-tier debut in June 2020 against Strømsgodset.

References

1997 births
Living people
People from Grimstad
Norwegian footballers
FK Jerv players
IK Start players
Norwegian First Division players
Eliteserien players
Association football defenders
Norway under-21 international footballers
Sportspeople from Agder
21st-century Norwegian people